Hisdesat ('Hisdesat Strategic Services') is a Spanish company created in 2001 by Hispasat (43%), Ingeniería y Servicios Aeroespaciales (30%), EADS CASA (15%, now Airbus), Indra Sistemas (7%) and SENER (5%) with initial investment of 415 million euros.

Satellites 
Satellites:
 Spainsat, secure communications, GEO
 XTAR-EUR, secure communications, GEO
 Paz, Earth observation, SSO, synthetic-aperture radar (SAR), X-band
 Spainsat NG I, secure communications, GEO
 Spainsat NG II, secure communications, GEO

Launched satellites 

Other sources:

See also 

 Hispasat, another Spanish satellite operator

References

External links 
 

Communications satellite operators
Direct broadcast satellite services
Free-to-air
Space program of Spain